The  is a Japanese double-headed drum.  drums are usually laid sideways on stands, and are played on both drumheads with sticks known as .  drums have been used in taiko ensembles, but are also used in the  form of older Japanese court music.

History
The  is derived from the Chinese , a drum popular in China during the Tang Dynasty; the Korean  is also derived from this drum.

Construction
One way in which the  differs from the regular  drum is in the way in which it is made taut.

See also

References

External links

Drums
Japanese musical instruments
Japanese words and phrases